Glanfahan is a townland on the Dingle Peninsula, Ireland, notable for its large collection of clocháns, which form a National Monument.

Location

History

It is difficult to establish dates for Glenfahan as the drystone technique has been used in Ireland for millennia. However, it is believed to date to the early Christian period (5th–8th centuries AD), linked to the monastic traditions of the region and perhaps the pilgrimage route to Skellig Michael.

Other historians place their construction in the 12th century, when Norman invaders forced the Gaelic Irish to peripheral areas like the Dingle Peninsula.

It has been theorised that the huts were inhabited by the unfree and cashels by the freemen. Some Irish cashels remained in occupation up to the 18th century AD.

In the 19th century a cross-slab and rotary quern were found in Cahermurphy.

Some of the archeological sites were damaged in the 20th century by agricultural "improvements."

Excavations in 2011–12 under "Clochaun 3" turned up a sharpening stone, hammerstone and pieces of flint and quartz. Bone finds included sheep, goats (with flensing marks) and fish, as well as a wrasse tooth of a kind used in amulets. Bivalve shells and hazelnut shells were also found.

Description

There are 417 recorded dry stone structures, 19 souterrains and 18 standing stones in the area.

A group of clocháns, built in a traditional corbelling style, form an abandoned village.

Caherconner

An oval-shaped stone cashel containing three beehive huts.

Cahermurphy

An oval stone cashel  in diameter. The interior is occupied by a group of five conjoined clochauns and a sixth irregularly-shaped structure

Caherfadaandoruis

Caheradurras

A triple clochaun.

Clochanmore

References

Archaeological sites in County Kerry
National Monuments in County Kerry